This is a list of notable dance-punk artists.



0-9 
!!!

311

A 
Aerodrone
The Automatic 
ADULT.
Arctic Monkeys
Au Pairs

B 
Bang! Bang! Eche!
Bloc Party
The Bloody Beetroots
Bolt Action Five
The Bravery
Bush Tetras

C 
Cassette Kids
Clor
controller.controller
Cut Copy
CSS

D 
DARTZ!
Datarock
Delta 5
Death From Above 1979
Digitalism
Does It Offend You, Yeah?
Duchess Says
DZ Deathrays

E 
Electric Six
ESG
Every Move a Picture

F 
The Faint
Fake Shark - Real Zombie!
Foals
Franz Ferdinand

G 
Gang of Four
Goose
Guerilla Toss

H 
Hadouken!
Hockey
Hot Hot Heat

J 
James Chance and the Contortions
Joy Division
Justice

K 
Klaxons
Konk

L 
LCD Soundsystem
Le Tigre
Le Castle Vania
Liars
Liquid Liquid
Late of the Pier
Ladyhawke

M 
Matt and Kim
Maths Class
Math the Band
Medium Medium
Midnight Juggernauts
Mindless Self Indulgence
My Passion
Moving Units
McCafferty

N 
New Young Pony Club
Ninja High School
No Doubt

P 
Peaches
The Presets
Professor Murder
Pedicab
The Pop Group
Public Image Ltd

Q 
Q and Not U

R 
Radio 4
The Rapture
Republica

S 
The Sessions
SHITDISCO
Shout Out Out Out Out
Shriekback

T 
Talking Heads
Test Icicles
Thunderbirds Are Now!
Ting Tings
Taken by Cars
Tom Tom Club
The 1975

U 
United State of Electronica

V 
VCR
VHS or Beta
The Virgins
Vitalic

W 
WhoMadeWho
The Whip

Y 
Yeah Yeah Yeahs
You Say Party

References 

 
Lists of dance musicians
Lists of punk bands